Esporte Clube Operário de Mafra, commonly known as Operário de Mafra, is a Brazilian football club based in Mafra, Santa Catarina state. The club was formerly known as Sociedade Esportiva e Recreativa Operários Mafrenses and Clube Atlético Operário.

History
The club was founded on May 12, 1897, as Clube Atlético Operário, in the 1990s it was renamed to Sociedade Esportiva e Recreativa Operários Mafrenses, but the club's logo still depicts the acronym CAO, meaning Clube Atlético Operário. They won the Campeonato Catarinense Third Level in 1913, 1947, 1996.

Achievements
 Campeonato Catarinense Third Level:
 Winners (3): 1913, 1947, 1996

Stadium
Sociedade Esportiva e Recreativa Operários Mafrenses play their home games at Estádio Alfredo Herbst. The stadium has a maximum capacity of 3,000 people.

References

Association football clubs established in 1897
Football clubs in Santa Catarina (state)
1897 establishments in Brazil